Nikola Eterović (born 20 January 1951) is a Croatian prelate of the Catholic Church who has been a titular archbishop and the Apostolic Nuncio to Germany since 2013.

Biography 
Nikola Eterović was born on 20 January 1951 in Pučišća. He was ordained a priest of the Diocese of Hvar on 26 June 1977 by Bishop Celestin Bezmalinović.

To prepare for a diplomatic career he entered the Pontifical Ecclesiastical Academy in 1977. On 25 March 1980 he joined the diplomatic service of the Holy See. He fulfilled early assignments in the Apostolic Nunciatures in the Côte d'Ivoire, Spain, and Nicaragua and in the offices of the Secretariat of State.

Pope John Paul II appointed him titular archbishop of Sisak and Apostolic Nuncio to the Ukraine on 22 May 1999. He was consecrated a bishop on 10 July 1999 by Cardinal Secretary of State Angelo Sodano, assisted by Ante Jurić, Archbishop of Split, and Slobodan Štambuk, Bishop of Hvar. 

On 11 February 2004, he was named general secretary of the Synod of Bishops.

On 27 November 2009, anticipating the creation of the Diocese of Sisak on 5 December, Eterović was made titular archbishop of Cibalae by Pope Benedict XVI. Pope Francis appointed him Apostolic Nuncio to Germany on 21 September 2013.

Eterović was named a member of the Congregation for the Evangelization of Peoples on 9 May 2009 and of the Pontifical Council for Promoting the New Evangelization on 20 December 2010.

See also
 List of heads of the diplomatic missions of the Holy See

References

External links 

 Nikola Eterović in catholic-hierarchy.org 

1951 births
Living people
21st-century Roman Catholic archbishops in Croatia
21st-century Roman Catholic titular archbishops
Members of the Congregation for the Evangelization of Peoples
Members of the Pontifical Council for the Promotion of the New Evangelisation
People from Pučišća
Apostolic Nuncios to Ukraine
Apostolic Nuncios to Germany
Pontifical Ecclesiastical Academy alumni
Croatian Roman Catholic archbishops